Lise Solveig Wiik (born 23 March 1947) is a Norwegian teacher, researcher and politician for the Labour Party.

She served as a deputy representative to the Parliament of Norway from Telemark during the terms 2001–2005, 2005–2009 and 2013–2017. On the local level Wiik was the mayor of Notodden from 2007 to 2011, and she has served as a member of Telemark County Council.

She has been a lecturer and dean at Telemark University College, chair of the Notodden Blues Festival since 2010 and the Telemark Research Institute since 2011.

References

External links

1947 births
Living people
People from Notodden
Deputy members of the Storting
Labour Party (Norway) politicians
Mayors of places in Telemark
Women mayors of places in Norway
Academic staff of Telemark University College
20th-century Norwegian women politicians
20th-century Norwegian politicians
Women members of the Storting